Petar Ozretić (27 February 1920 – 30 November 1996) was a Croatian rower. He competed in the men's coxless four event at the 1948 Summer Olympics.

References

1920 births
1996 deaths
Croatian male rowers
Olympic rowers of Yugoslavia
Rowers at the 1948 Summer Olympics
Rowers from Split, Croatia
Burials at Lovrinac Cemetery